Mikhael Yambe (born 15 February 1999) is a Ivorian professional footballer. As of 2021, he plays for Spartaks Jūrmala.

References

External links 
 
 

1999 births
Living people
Ivorian footballers
Ivorian expatriate footballers
Expatriate footballers in Latvia
Expatriate footballers in Belarus
Association football forwards
FK Spartaks Jūrmala players
FC Sputnik Rechitsa players
People from Bondoukou